AirLony is a Czech aircraft manufacturer based in Štětí. The company specializes in the design and manufacture of complete ultralight aircraft and aircraft kits for amateur construction.

The company's sole current product is the AirLony Skylane UL, which is a two-seat ultralight replica of the four seat Cessna 182.

Aircraft

References

External links

Aircraft manufacturers of the Czech Republic and Czechoslovakia
Ultralight aircraft
Homebuilt aircraft